Yuhi may refer to:

People

Japan 
, Japanese long-distance runner
 Yuhi Sano (born 1965), Japanese professional wrestler
 Yuhi Sekiguchi (born 1987), Japanese racing driver
 Yuhi (wrestler) (born 1995), Japanese professional wrestler

Rwanda 
 Yuhi I of Rwanda
 Yuhi II of Rwanda
 Yuhi III of Rwanda
 Yuhi V of Rwanda

Fictional characters 
 Kurenai Yuhi

Locations 
 Yuhi Falls

Japanese masculine given names